Ananikha is a rural locality (a village) in Zadneselskoye Rural Settlement, Ust-Kubinsky  District, Vologda Oblast, Russia. The population was 3 as of 2002.

Geography 
Ananikha is located 37 km north of Ustye (the district's administrative centre) by road. Karpovskoye is the nearest rural locality.

References 

Rural localities in Tarnogsky District